Leonie Pless (born 31 December 1988) is a German rower.

She won a medal at the 2019 World Rowing Championships.

References

External links

1988 births
Living people
German female rowers
Sportspeople from Kassel
World Rowing Championships medalists for Germany